The black-headed cuckooshrike (Lalage melanoptera) is a species of cuckooshrike found in the Indian Subcontinent and Southeast Asia.

Gallery

References

black-headed cuckooshrike
Birds of South Asia
black-headed cuckooshrike